Yuriy Dudnyk (born 12 September 2002) is a professional Ukrainian football defender who played for FC Zorya Luhansk.

Career
Dudnyk is a product of the Kremin Kremenchuk and Metalurh Zaporizhya youth sportive school systems.

In August 2019 he was signed by Zorya Luhansk and he made his debut for this club in the Ukrainian Premier League as a second half-time substituted player in the winning home match against FC Oleksandriya on 9 May 2021.

References

External links
Profile at UAF Official Site (Ukr)

2002 births
Living people
Ukrainian footballers
Ukrainian Premier League players
FC Zorya Luhansk players
Association football defenders